TV Sorrisi e Canzoni (TV Smiles and Songs) is an Italian weekly listings magazine published in Segrate, Italy.

History and profile

TV Sorrisi e Canzoni was established in 1952. Based in Segrate, Milan, the magazine is published by Arnoldo Mondadori Editore, the biggest Italian publishing company. The magazine is published on a weekly basis.

TV Sorrisi e Canzoni had a circulation of 1,836,355 copies in 1984. The circulation of magazine rose to 1,997,809 copies from September 1993 to August 1994. Founded in 1952 by Agostino Campi for Editoriale Campi, it was one of top 50 best-selling television magazines worldwide with a circulation of 1,622,000 copies in 2001. Its circulation was 1,381,000 copies in 2004, making it the best-selling magazine in Italy. It was the best-selling television magazine in Italy in 2007 with a circulation of 1,086,414 copies. The magazine had a circulation of 883,220 copies in 2010.

See also
 List of magazines in Italy
 Telegatto

References

External links

 

1952 establishments in Italy
Italian-language magazines
Weekly magazines published in Italy
Listings magazines
Magazines established in 1952
Television magazines
Magazines published in Milan